Below is a list of festivals in Indonesia. The list is divided based on their respective calendar.

Changing date
Indonesia Menari
Caci, Flores
Festival Baleo, Lembata
NgayogJazz, Yogyakarta
Gawai Dayak, West Kalimantan
Indonesian Film Festival, Jakarta
Jakarta Fashion & Food Festival, Jakarta
Jazz Goes to Campus, University of Indonesia, Depok
Jember Fashion Carnival, Jember
Lombok Full Moon Festival, Gili Trawangan (every full moon)
Makepung, Bali
Nihon no Matsuri, Telkom Institute of Technology
Pacu jawi, Tanah Datar Regency, West Sumatra
Q! Film Festival
Tiwah, Central Kalimantan
Tomohon International Flower Festival, Tomohon, North Sulawesi

Gregorian calendar

January
Festival Manulude, Sangihe Talaud, North Sulawesi
Maudu Lompoa, Takalar
February
Bau Nyale Putri Mandalika, Kuta Beach, Lombok (between February and March)
Pasola, 4 villages in West Sumba (between February and March)
March
Bali Spirit Festival, Bali (March)
Jakarta International Java Jazz Festival, Jakarta (early March)
Megou Pak, Tulangbawang, Lampung
Buleleng Folk Festival, Singaraja, Bali (March–April)
April
Festival Legu Gam, Ternate (early April until April 13)
May
Festival Teluk Jailolo, West Halmahera
Unduh-unduh, Mojowarno, East Java (early May)
Art Jog, Taman Budaya Yogyakarta (early May until June 4)
June
Festival Danau Sentani, Jayapura, Papua
Festival Malioboro, Yogyakarta (June)
Festival Danau Toba, North Sumatra (June–July)
Bali Arts Festival (Festival Seni Bali), Bali (June)
Jakarta anniversary festivals (June 22):
Jakarnaval
Kemang Festival
Solo Batik Carnival, Surakarta (end of June)
July
Betawi Cultural Festival, Jakarta
Pasa Harau Art & Culture Festival, Harau Valley, West Sumatra
Bali Kite Festival, Bali (July)
Erau, Tenggarong (July since 2009)
Krakatau Festival, Lampung (July–October)
August
Karapan sapi, Madura (August–October)
Parade Kuda Kosong, Cianjur (17 August)
September
Festival Lembah Baliem, Papua (September)
October
Festival Hantu Gadu, Kepuk village, Jepara (12 October)
Jogja Java Carnival, Yogyakarta (October)
Kuta Karnival, Kuta, Bali (around 12 October)
Reyog Jazz, Ponorogo
Banyuwangi Festival, Banyuwangi
Maratua Jazz & Dive Fiesta, Berau East Borneo
November
Djakarta Artmosphere, Jakarta (20 November)
Jakarta International Film Festival, Jakarta (around November–December)
Perang Topat, western Lombok
Petik Laut, Banyuwangi
Mahakam Jazz Fiesta, Samarinda
NgayogJazz, Yogyakarta
December
Iraw Tengkayu, Tarakan (December, held biannually)
Lovely December, Tana Toraja
New Year's Eve (December 31)

Lunar calendar

Traditional Chinese festivals in Indonesia are usually known under their Hokkien names, with several dialects exist some cities e.g. Medan and Bagansiapiapi.

Vedic (lunisolar) calendar

Vaisakha
Waisak (full moon of Vaisakha)

Islamic/Javanese (lunar) calendar

Muharram
Grebeg Suro, Ponorogo (1 Muharram)
Hajat Sasih Ceremony, Kampung Naga (Muharam, Rabi' al-awwal, Sha'aban, and Dhu al-Qi'dah)
Tabot, Bengkulu (1-10 Muharram)
Tabuik, West Sumatra (10 Muharram)
Safar
Rabu Pungkasan, Bantul (last Wednesday of Safar)
Rabi' al-awwal
Sekaten, Surakarta and Yogyakarta (5-12 Rabi' al-awwal)
Muludan Keraton Kasultanan Cirebon, Cirebon (12 Rabi' al-awwal)
Ampyang Maulid, Kudus (12 Rabi' al-awwal)
Nyadar, Desa Pinggir Papas. (3 times after 12 Rabi' al-awwal)
Jumada al-thani
Serak Gulo, Padang (1 Jumada al-thani)
Rajab
Uler-Uler Ritual, Jungsemi village, Demak (Wage Friday in Rajab)
Sha'aban
Pesta Baratan, Jepara (15 Sha'ban)
Ramadan
First of Ramadan celebrations:
Dhandhangan, Kudus
Dugderan, Semarang
Megengan, Demak

Syawal
Lebaran (1 Syawal)
Barong Ider Bumi, Banyuwangi (2 Syawal)
Pukul Manyapu, Mamala and Morella village, Maluku (7 Syawal)
Pesta Lomban, Jepara (8 Syawal)
Dhu al-Hijjah
Perang Obor, Tegal Sambi Village, Jepara (Pahing Monday to eve of Pon Tuesday)
Grebeg Besar Demak, Demak (10 Dhu al-Hijjah)

Other

Balinese calendar
This list includes festivals which don't follow any of the previous calendars, such as the Balinese pawukon and saka calendar.

Galungan and Kuningan 
Odalan (temple anniversary in Bali, held once every Pawukon year)
Nyepi (held once every Saka year)

Hindu calendar
 Deepavali 
 Holi

Tamil calendar
 Thaipusam

Tengger calendar
Yadnya Kasada

References

 
 Indonesia
 Indonesia